Samuli Piipponen (born February 13, 1993) is a Finnish professional ice hockey defenceman currently playing for Lukko of the Liiga.

Piipponen made his Liiga debut for SaiPa during the 2013–14 season, playing seven games and scoring one goal and two assists. He signed for Jukurit of Mestis the following season, who were then granted membership to Liiga in 2016 to replace Blues after they folded due to bankruptcy.

References

External links

1993 births
Living people
Finnish ice hockey defencemen
Iisalmen Peli-Karhut players
KeuPa HT players
KooKoo players
Lukko players
Mikkelin Jukurit players
SaiPa players
SaPKo players
Ice hockey people from Helsinki